Keep the Corpses Quiet is the second album from punk rock band The Forgotten. It is their third release under TKO Records, overall release No. 49 by the label itself. It was released in September 2000 on limited edition red vinyl, black vinyl and CD. It contains one of the band's most popular songs, "Silent Weapons", which Greg Brodick produced a music video for.

Track listing

Personnel
Gordy Carbone – Lead vocals 
Craig Fairbaugh – Guitar, Bass guitar, Vocals
Johnny (Bleachedjeans) Gregurich - Bass guitar
Dave Kashka – Drums

Production
The Forgotten – Producer
Robert Berry – Engineer

References

2000 albums
The Forgotten (band) albums